The Perth International in badminton, is an international open held in Perth, Australia. The event is first held as Western Australia International in 2003. The tournament sanctioned by the Badminton World Federation, and part of the Badminton Oceania circuit.

Previous winners

Performances by nation

References 

Badminton tournaments in Australia